Durack River is a river in the Kimberley region of Western Australia.

The river rises below the Durack Range then flows north, discharging into the west arm of Cambridge Gulf.

There are 14 tributaries of the Durack, including Chapman River, Wood River, Ellenbrae Creek, Royston Creek, Koolawerii Creek and Wilson Creek.

The river was named in 1882 by the surveyor John Pentecost after explorer and Kimberley pioneer Michael Durack, who was the first European to cross the river.

The traditional owners of the area that the river flows through are the Kitja, Ola and Wilawila peoples.

References 

Rivers of the Kimberley region of Western Australia
Cambridge Gulf